in Sendai, Miyagi Prefecture, Japan is the mausoleum complex of Date Masamune and his heirs, daimyō of the Sendai Domain.

History
Zuihōden was erected in the following year. A number of the Date daimyō and other members of the Date clan are buried in the grounds. Most of the monuments were destroyed by bombing and subsequent fires in 1945 and subsequently rebuilt in their original Momoyama style.

Monuments

Zuihōden
The  was built for Date Masamune (1567–1636), founding daimyō of the Sendai Domain.

Kansenden
The  was built for Date Tadamune (1599–1658), second daimyō of the Sendai Domain. Designated a National Treasure in 1931, it was destroyed in 1945 and rebuilt in 1985.

Zennōden
The  was built for Date Tsunamune (1640–1711), third daimyō of the Sendai Domain. Destroyed in 1945, it was rebuilt in 1985 and repaired in 2007.

Myōnkaibyō
The  is the site of stelai erected for Date Chikamune, ninth daimyō, and Date Nariyoshi, eleventh daimyō of the Sendai Domain.

Okosamagobyō

Museum

See also

Date clan
Sendai Domain
Entsū-in
Tōshō-gū

References

External links
 Zuihōden homepage

Date clan
Shinto shrines in Miyagi Prefecture
Mausoleums in Japan
Museums in Miyagi Prefecture